Virgin boy eggs are a traditional dish of Dongyang, Zhejiang, China in which eggs are boiled in the urine of young boys, preferably under the age of ten. Named "tong zi dan" (Chinese: 童子蛋; pinyin: Tóngzǐdàn), the dish translates literally to "boy egg."

History
The dish is a longstanding tradition in Dongyang, and its practices date back centuries. In general, China has had a long history of food preservation methods. Tea eggs were originally developed to preserve the food for long periods of time. While the boy eggs may not have necessarily had the same origin, their development comes from the similar cultural background. There is no good explanation for why it must be boys' urine, specifically; it has simply been so for centuries. However, it is historically believed in the region that urine has various health benefits and was commonly ingested in ancient times. In such times, eggs were one of the only nutritional food items available to peasants and farmers. Due to Zhejiang's hilly and riverside landscapes, agriculture has been a staple in the region's culture for centuries. Although rice was the most widely grown crop, most peasants raised their own pigs and poultry on their land as well. This led to the eggs' availability to the common person and, with the added perceived benefit of urine, the virgin boy eggs grew in popularity. The dish's traditional nature stems from the tendency in Chinese food culture to place emphasis on the detailed history of a specific food.
Although the exact history is somewhat obscure to most official sources, the longstanding trend of Chinese food explains the people of Dongyang's loyalty to a traditional dish to which many others find an aversion.

Preparation
The dish is prepared by first soaking the eggs in the urine of young boys. The urine is sourced locally by each vendor. Then the mixture is heated over a stove. After boiling, the egg shells are cracked around the entire surface of the egg. Afterwards, the eggs are placed back into the urine. The used urine is then replaced with fresh urine and the process is repeated. The soaking process allows the eggs to  become cured in the urine as they are left to simmer. The entire process is generally a day-long endeavor. According to some recipes, different herbs may also be added to the marinade. When finished, the eggs' whites have a pale golden hue and the yolks turn green. Virgin boy eggs are similar to century eggs in their curing process and historical roots, although century eggs have become much more popularly widespread and do not use urine.

Modern culture
Virgin boy eggs are widely accepted as a time-honored tradition of the city, rather than considered taboo as they are most other cultures. Boy egg vendors go to elementary schools in the city where they collect urine from young boys, preferably under the age of ten. The children, having been raised in the city and its culture, are used to the practice. As young boys would in schools from many other cultures, they excuse themselves from class when they feel the urge to urinate. However, instead of going to the restroom, they relieve themselves in the basin that the vendors place in the hallways. Some vendors go as far as to wait with containers in parks or public restrooms for a parent who is willing to let their child offer urine. The teachers, being accustomed to the tradition as well, often remind the boys not to urinate in the basin if any of them have a fever or feel ill. In addition to buying them from street vendors, residents of Dongyang are also known to cook and prepare the eggs at home, using the urine from household boys. Although modern medical research provides evidence that there are no health benefits from ingesting urine, the virgin boy eggs remain deeply rooted in tradition. As of 2012, the eggs are sold for about 1.50 yuan (approximately $0.24) per egg and are approximately twice the price of normal eggs. However, not all of Dongyang's residents enjoy the dish. One local man was quoted stating, "The smell kills me. I feel like throwing up at the thought of it. It stinks.” In general, virgin boy eggs remain highly acclaimed by the people of Dongyang for both their taste and even their "fragrant" smell.

Health effects and folk medicine
Urine therapy has been a significant part of traditional Chinese medicine for much of its history. In ancient times, urine was used as a means of enhancing the effects of medicine, although today, the practice is widely viewed as unsanitary. It is widely speculated, however, that when urine dries it crystallizes resulting in a substance similar to the Chinese medicine, ren zhong bai. The crystallized urine sediment is said to aid in the mitigation of inflammation and inflammatory diseases as well as fungal infections of the skin and mouth. It is also claimed that the ingestion of the urine-soaked eggs can treat yin deficiency, decrease one's internal body heat, and promote blood circulation. Locals assert that the eggs also prevent heat stroke. It was widely believed in ancient China that eggs cured in one's own urine for seven days and consumed for a course of three months was a cure for chronic asthma. Among other uses for urine in Chinese medicine, a young boy's first urine of the day is considered to be very powerful and may be combined with herbs to make a tonic. Modern medical practitioners remain dubious of any health benefits of urine therapy in general. Evidence-based modern medicine has determined that urine "is waste expelled from the human body and basically contains no substance conducive to human health."

See also

List of egg dishes
Tea egg
Century egg
Urophagia

References

Dongyang
Foods and drinks produced with excrement
Egg dishes
Chinese cuisine
Chinese traditions
Cultural heritage of China
Traditional knowledge
Cultural anthropology
Conservation and restoration of cultural heritage
Culture in Zhejiang
Peasant food